At Point Blank is a Hong Kong romantic drama television series produced by TVB and starring Gallen Lo, Michael Tse, Kingdom Yuen and Louisa So. It was released overseas in August 2001 and premiered in Hong Kong on 17 November 2006.

Cast

Main cast
Gallen Lo as Lennon Law King-fai (羅景輝)
Michael Tse as Bernard Chan Siu-ming (陳小明)
Kingdom Yuen as Ching Hiu-nam (程曉男)
Louisa So as Venessa Wan Yeung-yau (溫婉柔)
Myolie Wu as Samantha Ching Hiu-kwan (程曉君)
Mak Cheung-ching as Law Kai-fai (羅繼輝)

Other cast
Fiona Yuen as Cherrian Yau Mei-suet (尤美雪)
Kenny Wong as Lung Ng (龍五)
Chow Chung as Ching Sam (程琛)
Yu Yeung as Wan To (溫滔)
Dickson Lee as Robin Lee Sai-man (李世民)
Natalie Wong as Shum Man (沈玟)
Rainbow Ching as Ching Leung Suk-yin (程梁淑賢)
Felix Lok as Vincent Poon Wai-suen (潘偉遜)
Russell Cheung as Apprentice of the divine doctor (神醫徒弟)

External links
 Official Website

TVB dramas
2001 Hong Kong television series debuts
2001 Hong Kong television series endings
2006 Hong Kong television series debuts
2006 Hong Kong television series endings
Hong Kong romance television series
2000s Hong Kong television series
2000s romance television series
Television series about marriage
Cantonese-language television shows
Television shows set in Hong Kong
Television shows set in Thailand